Rodmal Nagar is a member of the Bharatiya Janata Party and has won the 2014 and 2019 Indian general elections from the Rajgarh constituency. His net worth is 3.61 crores (approx)

Personal life

His hometown is khujner.
He have 3 children 2 sons and 1 daughter.

Political Career

He became member of parliament from Rajgarh assembly in 2014. Earlier this seat is hold by Congress.

In 2019 general election, he retained his seat, and became member of parliament for second time straight.

He is also lifetime member of RSS.

References

Living people
India MPs 2014–2019
People from Rajgarh district
Lok Sabha members from Madhya Pradesh
Bharatiya Janata Party politicians from Madhya Pradesh
1960 births
India MPs 2019–present